Melodifestivalen 2014 was the Swedish music competition which selected Sweden's 54th entry for the Eurovision Song Contest 2014. Sanna Nielsen won the competition with the song "Undo". This was one of the closest results in Melodifestivalen history, as Nielsen beat her nearest rival, Ace Wilder, by only two points.

For the thirteenth consecutive year the competition consisted of four heats, a "Second Chance" round, and a final. A total of 32 entries were divided into four heats, with eight compositions in each. From each semifinal, the songs that won first and second place went directly to the final, while the songs that placed third and fourth proceeded to the Second Chance heat. The bottom four songs in each semifinal were eliminated from the competition. As in 2013, half of the competing entries were chosen by a selection panel from the received submissions, while the other half was selected through an invitation process by SVT. A new rule for the 2014 competition stipulated that at least 20% of the selected entries were to be written by female composers/lyricists in a full or partial capacity.

Format 
Melodifestivalen 2014 was the thirteenth consecutive year in which the competition took place in different cities across Sweden. The four semifinals were held in Malmö (1 February), Linköping (8 February), Gothenburg (15 February) and Örnsköldsvik (22 February). The Second Chance round was held in Lidköping on 1 March while the final in Solna was held on 8 March. Starting order is set.

Schedule

Heats

Heat 1

Heat 2

Heat 3

Heat 4

Second Chance 

The Andra Chansen (Second Chance) round was held on 1 March in Sparbanken Lidköping Arena, Lidköping.

First Round

Second Round

Final 

The final of Melodifestivalen 2014 took place on 8 March 2014 at the Friends Arena in Solna. The 10 songs that qualified for the finals had either accomplished being the top two in their respective semifinal, or qualified from the Second Chance round.

Ratings

References

External links
 Melodifestivalen Official Site
 Melodifestivalen reports 

Eurovision
2014
Eurovision Song Contest 2014
2014 in Swedish television
2014 song contests
February 2014 events in Europe
March 2014 events in Europe
2010s in Malmö
2010s in Gothenburg
Events in Lidköping
Events at Malmö Arena
Events in Gothenburg
Events in Örnsköldsvik
Events in Linköping
Events in Solna